or  is a United States Navy base in Yokosuka, Japan. Its mission is to maintain and operate base facilities for the logistic, recreational, administrative support and service of the U.S. Naval Forces Japan, Seventh Fleet and other operating forces assigned in the Western Pacific.  CFAY is the largest strategically important U.S. naval installation in the western Pacific.

Fleet Activities Yokosuka comprises 2.3 km2 (568 acres) and is located at the entrance of Tokyo Bay, 65 km (40 mi) south of Tokyo and approximately 30 km (20 mi) south of Yokohama on the Miura Peninsula in the Kantō region of the Pacific Coast in Central Honshu, Japan.

The 55 tenant commands which make up this installation support U.S. Navy Pacific operating forces, including principal afloat elements of the United States Seventh Fleet, including the only permanently forward-deployed aircraft carrier, the group she heads, Carrier Strike Group Five, and Destroyer Squadron 15.

History

When Commodore Matthew Perry arrived in Japan in 1853, using naval pressure to open up Japan to foreign trade, Yokosuka was a quaint, native fishing village. In 1860, Lord Oguri Kozuke-no-Suke, Minister of Finance to the Tokugawa Shogunate Government, decided that "If Japan is to assume an active role in world trade, she must have proper facilities to build and maintain large seagoing vessels." He called upon the French Consul General, Léon Roches, and asked for the assistance of the French government to build a shipyard and various basing facilities capable of handling large ships. French engineer Léonce Verny was sent to Japan to accomplish the task.

After the inspection of several sites, it was discovered that Yokosuka topographically, if on a smaller scale, resembled the port of Toulon, France. It was decided to establish the shipyard here. It would be called the "Yokosuka Iron Works". In 1871, the name was changed to the "Yokosuka Navy Yard". It was French engineer Louis-Émile Bertin who reorganized "Yokosuka Navy Yard" completely from 1886.

Yokosuka was to become one of the main arsenals of the Imperial Japanese Navy into the 20th century. Battleships such as Yamashiro, and aircraft carriers such as Hiryu and Shokaku were built there. Major naval aircraft were also designed at the Yokosuka Naval Air Technical Arsenal.  In addition, numerous other facilities, including the headquarters of various naval units, administration buildings, military training schools, airfields, communication facilities, barracks, armories and a military hospital were established nearby in the course of its history, turning the area around the arsenal into a major fleet base.

During World War II, activities at the Yokosuka Navy Yard reached their peak. By 1944, it covered  and employed over 40,000 workers. In addition to the shipbuilding plant, the yard also had a gun factory, ordnance and supply depots, a fuel storage facility, a seaplane base and a naval air station.

U.S. Navy base

On 30 August 1945, Vice Admiral Michitaro Totsuka, last Japanese commander of the Yokosuka Naval District, surrendered his command to Rear Admiral Robert Carney, and the base was peacefully occupied by U.S. Marines of the 6th Marine Division, British Royal Marines and U.S. Naval personnel. Commander Fleet Activities (COMFLEACT) Yokosuka was created shortly after the occupation in 1945. As the Base became organized, the shipyard was deactivated and much of the equipment was sent to other countries as part of reparations. The repair ship  took charge of ship repair and maintenance, the hospital became a Naval Dispensary (later Naval Hospital Yokosuka Japan) and the Supply Department was organized to provide support to the fleet and shore-based activities. The Public Works Department was also established. Yokosuka Submarine Base was founded in September 1945.

In May 1946, the Marines at Yokosuka were redesignated Marine Barracks, U.S. Fleet Activities, Yokosuka. In April 1947, the Ship Repair Department was organized, and the shops and dry docks were reactivated to maintain the ships of the U.S. Fleet in the Pacific. With the onset of the Korean War on 25 June 1950, Yokosuka Navy Base suddenly became very important and extremely busy.

The U.S., still an occupying power in Japan, turned its full efforts to the support of South Korea. The Navy Dispensary was enlarged and expanded and was commissioned a U.S. Naval Hospital in 1950. The Naval Communications Facility, Yokosuka, was commissioned in January 1951. In April 1951, the Ship Repair Department became a component command. It was redesignated the Ship Repair Facility. As the major naval ship repair facility in the Far East, the Yokosuka Facility assumed a vital role in maintenance and repair of the U.S. Seventh Fleet during both the Korean War and Vietnam War.

In March 1952, the geographical boundaries of Naval Forces Far East were changed to exclude the Philippines, Marianas, Bonin and Volcano Islands. In December 1952, the headquarters were shifted from Tokyo to Yokosuka. The expanded Supply Department of Fleet Activities became Naval Supply Depot, Yokosuka in August 1952. In 1960, the Naval Communications Facility was redesignated U.S. Naval Communications Station, Japan.

In 1952, occupation ended and rearmament commenced, with its naval forces formally organized as Japan Maritime Self Defense Force by 1954.  Some parts of the former Yokosuka Naval District were ceded back to house a new base for JMSDF.

On 5 October 1973, with Carrier Air Wing Five and her accompanying task group, put into Yokosuka, marking the first forward deployment of a complete carrier task group in a Japanese port. This was the result of an accord reached on 31 August 1972 between the U.S. and Japan. In addition to the morale factor of dependents housed along with the crew in a foreign port, the move had strategic significance because it facilitated the continuous positioning of three carriers in the Far East at a time when the economic situation demanded the reduction of carriers in the fleet. In August 1998,  relieved Independence as the 7th Fleet forward-based carrier.

On 1 December 2005, the U.S. Navy announced that in 2008 Kitty Hawk would be replaced by the nuclear-powered  .  A U.S. Navy spokesman said the decision was a mutual agreement between the United States and Japan.  Hiroyuki Hosoda, spokesman for Japan's government, said, "We believe that the change (of the carriers) will lead to maintaining the solid presence of the U.S. Navy and contribute to keeping Japan's security and international peace into the future."  On 25 September 2008, George Washington arrived in Yokosuka, making it the only forward-deployed, nuclear-powered aircraft carrier in the U.S. Navy.

In recent years, a number of high-profile international incidents involving U.S. sailors occurred around the base.  The most notable were two murders which occurred in 2006 and 2008. The first was committed by Airman William Oliver Reese, who beat to death 56-year-old Yokosuka woman Yoshie Sato and stole the equivalent of $130 from her purse. The second murder was committed by Seaman Olantunbosun Ugbogu, a Nigerian citizen who had joined the U.S. Navy, but had not yet received citizenship. Ugbogu stabbed a taxi driver to death in order to avoid paying a $200 fare, which he had incurred returning from Tokyo. He had been stationed aboard the guided missile cruiser , but was absent without leave at the time of the murder and considered a deserter. Both murders resulted in the U.S. Navy severely restricting the liberty of all sailors in the fleet.

Personnel and ships from the base assisted with Operation Tomodachi following and during the March 2011 Tōhoku earthquake and tsunami and Fukushima I nuclear accidents.  During the crisis, around 3,000 U.S. family members left the base, preferring to be outside Japan during a time of uncertainty.

Forward-deployed ships

Command ship
  – flagship, United States Seventh Fleet. [1979 - Present]

Aircraft carrier
  – flagship, Carrier Strike Group Five.

Cruisers

Destroyers
Destroyer Squadron 15 (COMDESRON 15)
 
 
 
 
 
 USS Shoup (DDG-86)

Ships formerly forward-deployed

  1958 – December 1968
  1998 - 2006
 
 
 
  2008–2015
  1998-2008
  1991-1998
  1997–2005
 
  1990–1996
  August 1992 – 2004
  March 1998 – 2005
 
  August 1977 – July 1988
  May 1975 – July 1988
  1973–1991
  March 1988–? 1995
 
  August 1988 – July 1998
  October 1980 – October 1990
  1983 – October 1990
 
 
  1968 – August 1970
  1968 – August 1970
 
 
 
 
 
 
 
 
 
 
  1954–1968
 
 
 
 
 
  2007-2020
 
  2005 - 2019
 
 
 
 
  1997 – 2021

Landmarks 
During the late 1960s and 1970s, the Yokosuka Microwave Communications Site was part of the telephone communications network in the Tokyo area. The building and 106.7 meter tall microwave tower was on the highest hill on the U.S. Navy base.

Komatsu, a historic restaurant near the naval base, became famous for serving Japanese navy personnel before 1945 and the U.S. Navy after.  However, it was destroyed by fire in 2016.

See also
 United States Fleet Activities Sasebo

References

External links 

 Navy Lodge Yokosuka
 
 

Fleet Activities Yokosuka
Yokosuka
Buildings and structures in Yokosuka, Kanagawa
Japan Maritime Self-Defense Force bases
1870 establishments in Japan